Corinnaeturris leucomata is a species of sea snail, a marine gastropod mollusk in the family Clathurellidae.

Description
The length of the shell attains 13.5 mm, its diameter 5.25 mm.

(Original description) The thin, polished shell is more or less translucent white and short-fusiform. it contains 10 whorls. The protoconch is thin, very minute, inflated, clear transparent brown and shows a shining surface. The succeeding whorls to it are three nuclear whorls, whitish brown, smooth, but not shining like the nucleus. subinflated, and with a sharp, strong, peripheral keel. The succeeding whorls are marked by a strongly defined broad band extending from the suture more than half-way over the whorl, descending steeply to the periphery, where the keel of the nuclear whorls is continued as two sharp raised threads which pass over strong oblique angular transverse projections, are clearly defined in the smaller whorls, but on the later ones become obsolete. On the body whorl (about six on the middle and nine on the anterior third) in advance of the peripheral nodules are about fifteen sharply raised threads, with interspaces up to 0.5 mm in width. Other revolving sculpture consistis of microscopic striae covering the shell, which in favorable localities in crossing the lines of growth (as, for instance, on the notch-band) occasionally give rise to microscopic shagreening, invisible except in a good light and under a good lens. The transverse sculpture consists only of generally faint lines of growth, and the oblique nodosities above mentioned, which extend on the posterior whorls from the periphery to the suture, and on the body whorl are proportionally smaller. These vary from eleven to thirteen in number per whorl. The ; aperture is narrow. The outer lip is much produced forward. The columella is twisted and the siphonal canal rather wide and somewhat recurved. The  deposit on the body whorl and columella is very slight. The anal sinus is wide, reaching nearly or quite  to the suture. The margins are all thin.

Distribution
This species occurs in the Atlantic Ocean off the Cape Verdes and in the Gulf of Mexico.

References

 Sysoev A.V. (2014). Deep-sea fauna of European seas: An annotated species check-list of benthic invertebrates living deeper than 2000 m in the seas bordering Europe. Gastropoda. Invertebrate Zoology. Vol.11. No.1: 134–155
 Gofas, S.; Le Renard, J.; Bouchet, P. (2001). Mollusca, in: Costello, M.J. et al. (Ed.) (2001). European register of marine species: a check-list of the marine species in Europe and a bibliography of guides to their identification. Collection Patrimoines Naturels, 50: pp. 180–213

External links
 Bush, K. (1893). Reports on the results of dredging under the supervision of Alexander Agassiz, in the Gulf of Mexico (1877-78), in the Caribbean Sea (1878, 79), and along the Atlantic coast of the United States (1880), by the U.S. Coast Survey Steamer "Blake." Lieut.-Com. C.D. Sigsbee, U.S.N., and Commander J.R. Bartlett, U.S.N., Commanding. XXXIV. Report on the Mollusca dredged by the "Blake" in 1880, including descriptions of several new species. Bulletin of the Museum of Comparative Zoology. 23(6): 199-244, pl. 1-2
 Dautzenberg, Ph.; Fischer, H. (1906). Mollusques provenant des dragages effectués à l'ouest de l'Afrique pendant les campagnes scientifiques de S.A.S. le Prince de Monaco. Résultats des Campagnes Scientifiques Accomplies sur son Yacht par Albert Ier Prince Souverain de Monaco, XXXII. Imprimerie de Monaco: Monaco. 125 p., 5 plates
 Locard A. (1897-1898). Expéditions scientifiques du Travailleur et du Talisman pendant les années 1880, 1881, 1882 et 1883. Mollusques testacés. Paris, Masson. vol. 1 [1897, p. 1-516 pl. 1-22; vol. 2 [1898], p. 1-515, pl. 1-18]
 Rosenberg G., Moretzsohn F. & García E. F. (2009). Gastropoda (Mollusca) of the Gulf of Mexico, Pp. 579–699 in Felder, D.L. and D.K. Camp (eds.), Gulf of Mexico–Origins, Waters, and Biota. Biodiversity. Texas A&M Press, College Station, Texas
 Lectotype at MNHN, Paris

leucomata
Molluscs of the Atlantic Ocean
Gastropods of Cape Verde
Gastropods described in 1881